Ole Tobias Olsen (18 August 1830 – 6 July 1924) was a Norwegian teacher and minister. He is best known as the father of the Nordland Line between Trondheim and Bodø in Nordland county, Norway.

Biography
Olsen was a teacher at Tromsø during 1851 followed by service at Hadsel in Vesterålen and  Kristiania, now Oslo in 1855. He earned his theological degree in 1865. In 1870, he received a scholarship to collect local fairy tales, folklore and folk tunes from Rana. He was vicar and mayor of Hattfjelldal from 1883 to 1904. In 1905, he moved to Kristiania where he lived until his death.

In early 1870, he had undertaken a preliminary study of a proposed railway line eastwards from Mo i Rana. He first proposed in construction of the 729 km. long Northern Line railway  from Bodø to Trondheim in Morgenbladet during 1872. He was a member of Nordland County Railway Commission from 1885. In 1919, he was knighted 1st class in the Order of St. Olav. In 1923, the year before he died, the Norwegian Parliament approved the Nordland Line to be extend to Bodo, the end destination of the rail line.

Personal life
Ole Tobias Olsen was from the Dunderland Valley in the municipality of Rana in Nordland county, Norway. He was born on the Bjøllånes farm, the son of farmer Ole Pedersen Bjellånes (1774–1849) and Milda Nilsdotter (1800–1878). In 1877, he married Christine Bernhardine Dahl (1855–1910). Together they had ten children.

Selected works
Nogle Indlednings-Salmer –  1891
Norske folkeeventyr og sagn: samlet i Nordland  – 1912

Memorials
Mo I Rana  - Ole Tobias Hotel
Mo I Rana -  Ole Tobias Olsens gate
Mo I Rana - Bust at Mo i Rana Rail station
Bodø - Ole Tobias Olsens vei

References

Other Source
Svanberg, Erling (1990) Langs vei og lei i Nordland : samferdsel i Nordland gjennom 3000 år (Bodø: Nordland fylkeskommune) .

External links
Northern Railway Official website

20th-century Norwegian Lutheran clergy
Norwegian educators
Norwegian male poets
Norwegian State Railways (1883–1996) people
People from Rana, Norway
1830 births
1924 deaths
19th-century Norwegian Lutheran clergy